"Quisiera Ser" (I Would Like to Be) is a song by Spanish singer-songwriter Alejandro Sanz from Sanz's sixth studio album El Alma al Aire. It was released as a single on October 20th, 2000 by WEA Latina. The song is included on an EP consisting of four tracks: "Quisiera Ser", "Cuando Nadie Me Ve" and two additional mixes of "Quisiera Ser". The music video for the song was directed by Alejandro Toledo and features Spanish model Esther Cañadas.

"Quisiera Ser" is included on MTV Unplugged, the second live album by Sanz, produced by Humberto Gatica and released in 2001. In 2002, "Quisiera Ser" was performed live at the 44th Annual Grammy Awards as a duet between Sanz and Destiny's Child with Spanish and English lyrics.

Grammy performance 
In 2002 at the 44th Annual GRAMMY Awards, Sanz performed "Quisiera Ser" onstage with Destiny's Child. The song was performed in Spanish with English lyrics sung as a solo by Beyonce in the bridge section of the song. A plan for an Anglo album by Alejandro Sanz which was to include the English version of "Quisiera Ser" was abandoned with Beyonce filming "Goldmember" at that time.

Sanz was honored as the 2017 Latin Recording Academy Person of the Year event with a performance of "Quisiera Ser" by Camila Cabello with Juanes.

Compilation records & videos 
Alejandro Sanz' "Quisiera Ser" has appeared on compilation records and videos of Alejandro Sanz and various artists released on the WEA International and in 2017, by Universal Music.

 Various Artists - "People en Espanol:  Latin Pop", 2002
 Alejandro Sanz - Grandes Exitos, 1991-2004
 Alejandro Sanz - Los Videos 97_04
 Alejandro Sanz - Coleccion Definitiva, 2011
 Alejandro Sanz - +Es+

Chart performance

Weekly charts

Year-end charts

References

External links 
 Alejandro Sanz - Quisiera Ser (Official Music Video) on YouTube
 Alejandro Sanz & Destiny 's Child - Quisiera Ser on YouTube

2000 singles
2000 songs
Alejandro Sanz songs
Songs written by Alejandro Sanz